Pheidole diffidens is a species of ant in the subfamily Myrmicinae. It is found in Sri Lanka.

References

External links

 at antwiki.org
Animaldiversity.org

diffidens
Hymenoptera of Asia
Insects described in 1859